Vairamuthu Vamadevan (22 May 1935 – 14 February 2019 වෛරමුත්තු වාමදේවන්), popularly known as V. Vamadevan was a prolific cinematographer in Sri Lankan cinema. Considered as one of the pioneer cinematographers in Sinhala cinema, Vamadevan made several critically acclaimed films in a career spanned for more than six decades.

Personal life
Vamadevan was born on September 16, 1916 at the in Achchuveli, Jaffna, Sri Lanka. He completed education from Kopay Christian College, Jaffna.

He was married to his longtime partner, Siththima. The couple had one son: Darshan, three daughters: Priyatharshini, Indumathi and Vasuki. He was survived by his family at his residence No. 86, Muhandiram Road, Kollupitiya, Colombo 03.

He died on 14 February 2019 at the age of 83 while receiving treatments at Colombo National Hospital. Funeral was held on 17 February 2019.

Career
He was obsessed with cinema while in college, where he used to keep film magazines in his textbooks and was beaten more than once. Eventually, he ran away from home to somehow go to India and contribute to the film industry in Madras. However in 1957, he joined with Ceylon Studio on Kirula Road in Colombo as an assistant technician. A group of Indian technicians worked hard to start a laboratory at the Ceylon Art Gallery. where Vamadevan also got a job as a laboratory assistant under the guidance of P. Mahendran. During this period, Ceylon Studio has been working on the film Daskama. Then in B. A. W. Jayamanne's film Vanaliya allowed him to work as an assistant cameraman for the first time. In the film, he worked under M. D. Sumanasekara, the first Sinhala cinematographer in Ceylon cinema. Then Vamadevan was the assistant cameraman of Oba Dutu Daa, Hadisi Vivahaya and Kawata Andarae. During this period, he met the friend Gamini Fonseka. He first met Gamini when the film Sri 296 was made in Ceylon Studios. He then worked as an assistant cameraman and assisted in the completion of the film Seegiri Kashyapa. Meanwhile, Vamadevan trained as an assistant cameraman under renowned cinematographer M. S. Ananda. 

At that time, Vamadevan met Shivanandan, the advertising manager of Cinemas Limited and was able to make his intentions to work with V. Rameshwaram who was the Managing Director of Cinemas Limited, India. But by then, Cinemas had also stopped making films in India and was building a huge studio, Vijaya Studio in Hendala, Wattala in Sri Lanka. Although Vamadevan was an assistant cameraman, he assisted with everything in the Vijaya studio in 1960. When at Vijaya Studio, his friendship with Gamini Fonseka blossomed at the Vijaya studio. As a request from Gamini, Vamadevan made his maiden cinematography in the film Oba Dutu Da directed by Shivanandan. Then, Vamadevan joined with the filmmaker Masthan and Gamini forced Masthan to give cinematography of the film Sura Chauraya in 1967.

Since then, Vamadevan has excelled in a number of films including; Aatma Pooja, Edath Sūrayā Adath Sūrayā, Sūrayangeth Sūrayā, Hondama Welāva, Hondai Narakai, Hita Honda Minihek, Kavuda Rajā, Deviyani Oba Kohida, Apsarā, Chin Chin Nōnā, Uthumāṇeni, Sabeethā, Mayurigē Kathāva, Bāndurā Mal, Sakviti Suvaya, Sāgarayak Mæda, Koṭi Valigaya, Satyagrahaṇaya and Nomiyena Minisun. He has also contributed to several foreign films such as Rampage, The Further Adventures of Tennessee Buck, and Mother Teresa: In the Name of God's Poor. He is the first cinematographer to win the award for the Best Cinematographer at first Presidential Awards Ceremony for the film Rampage.

Vamadevan became a film producer with the film Ra Manamali. Among the films directed by Gamini Fonseka, the only film Vamadevan did not act in was Ra Manamali. The film was one of Vamadevan's excellent black and white photography films. In 2010, he was awarded the lifetime Rana Thisara Award at the Sarasaviya Awards. In 2014, he was represented the film industry on the Board of Directors of the National Film Corporation of Sri Lanka. In 2018, he was honored with Lifetime Achievement Award at the Jaffna International Film Festival. At the 72nd anniversary celebrations of Sinhala cinema, Vamadevan was recognized and honored him with awards for one last time. His last cinema contribution came through the film Surya which is yet to release.

Filmography

References

External links 

1935 births
2019 deaths
People from Jaffna District
Sri Lankan cinematographers
Sri Lankan Tamil people